Koscielny or Kościelny (masculine), Kościelna (feminine), and Kościelne (neuter or plural) are Polish adjectives derived from the word kościół ("church"). They are widely used in Polish place names and may also appear as a surname, e.g. Laurent Koscielny, a French footballer of Polish ancestry.

Places using Kościelny

Administrative districts 
 Gmina Bargłów Kościelny, a district in Podlaskie Voivodeship
 Gmina Janowiec Kościelny, a district in Warmian-Masurian Voivodeship
 Gmina Juchnowiec Kościelny, a district in Podlaskie Voivodeship
 Gmina Lipowiec Kościelny, a district in Masovian Voivodeship
 Gmina Miastków Kościelny, a district in Masovian Voivodeship
 Gmina Szczawin Kościelny, a district in Masovian Voivodeship

Villages 
 Bargłów Kościelny, a village in Podlaskie Voivodeship
 Budzisław Kościelny, a village in Greater Poland Voivodeship
 Cienin Kościelny, a village in Greater Poland Voivodeship
 Czyżew Kościelny, a village in Podlaskie Voivodeship
 Janowiec Kościelny, a village in Warmian-Masurian Voivodeship
 Juchnowiec Kościelny, a village in Podlaskie Voivodeship
 Kundzin Kościelny, a village in Podlaskie Voivodeship
 Łęg Kościelny, a village in Masovian Voivodeship
 Łubin Kościelny, a village in Podlaskie Voivodeship
 Szczawin Kościelny, Łódź Voivodeship, a village in central Poland
 Szczawin Kościelny, Masovian Voivodeship, a village in central Poland
 Zawidz Kościelny, a village in Masovian Voivodeship
 Zemborzyn Kościelny, a village in Świętokrzyskie Voivodeship

Places using Kościelna

Administrative districts 
 Gmina Turośń Kościelna, a district in Podlaskie Voivodeship
 Gmina Wieczfnia Kościelna, a district in Masovian Voivodeship

Villages 
 Boruja Kościelna, a village in Greater Poland Voivodeship
 Czarna Wieś Kościelna, a village in Podlaskie Voivodeship 
 Dąbrówka Kościelna, Greater Poland Voivodeship, a village in west-central Poland
 Dąbrówka Kościelna, Podlaskie Voivodeship, a village in north-eastern Poland
 Długa Kościelna, a village in Masovian Voivodeship
 Jabłoń Kościelna, a village in Podlaskie Voivodeship
 Jabłonka Kościelna, a village in Podlaskie Voivodeship
 Kalinówka Kościelna, a village in Podlaskie Voivodeship
 Kościelna Góra, a village in Masovian Voivodeship
 Kościelna Jania, a village in Pomeranian Voivodeship
 Kościelna Wieś (disambiguation), several villages
 Krępa Kościelna, a village in Masovian Voivodeship
 Księżomierz Kościelna, a village in Lublin Voivodeship
 Niedrzwica Kościelna, a village in Lublin Voivodeship
 Niedrzwica Kościelna-Kolonia, a village in Lublin Voivodeship
 Niewodnica Kościelna, a village in Podlaskie Voivodeship
 Płonka Kościelna, a village in Podlaskie Voivodeship
 Ruda Kościelna, a village in Świętokrzyskie Voivodeship
 Tłokinia Kościelna, a village in Greater Poland Voivodeship 
 Turośń Kościelna, a village in Podlaskie Voivodeship
 Wiązowna Kościelna, a village in Masovian Voivodeship
 Wieczfnia Kościelna, a village in Masovian Voivodeship

Places using Kościelne

Administrative districts 
 Gmina Kołaki Kościelne
 Gmina Kulesze Kościelne
 Gmina Skarżysko Kościelne
 Gmina Zaręby Kościelne

Villages 
 Bądkowo Kościelne
 Bońkowo Kościelne
 Borkowo Kościelne
 Borysławice Kościelne
 Chwałkowo Kościelne
 Dobrzyniewo Kościelne
 Dworszowice Kościelne
 Dworszowice Kościelne-Kolonia
 Górecko Kościelne
 Gradzanowo Kościelne
 Izdebno Kościelne
 Jezierzyce Kościelne
 Kaszewy Kościelne
 Kołaki Kościelne
 Kuchary Kościelne
 Kulesze Kościelne
 Łagiewniki Kościelne
 Łęki Kościelne
 Łęki Kościelne SK
 Lisewo Kościelne
 Majewo Kościelne
 Malice Kościelne
 Murzynowo Kościelne
 Ostrowo Kościelne
 Pawłowo Kościelne
 Palędzie Kościelne
 Podlesie Kościelne
 Popowo Kościelne, Greater Poland Voivodeship
 Rosochate Kościelne
 Skarżysko Kościelne
 Strzyżewo Kościelne
 Świdry Kościelne
 Wojkowice Kościelne
 Wyszonki Kościelne
 Wyszyny Kościelne
 Zakrzewo Kościelne
 Załuskie Kościelne
 Zambski Kościelne
 Zaręby Kościelne
 Żmijewo Kościelne

See also
 

Polish-language surnames